Cyrus Thompson (1855–1930) was a politician and leader of the Populist Party in the U.S. state of North Carolina.  He served as North Carolina Secretary of State for one term, from 1897 to 1901.

Thompson, a medical doctor and farmer, represented Onslow County in the North Carolina House of Representatives in 1883, and in the North Carolina Senate in 1885. Both times, he was elected as a Democrat. Thompson became a leader in the Farmers Alliance and bolted from the Democrats to become a Populist.

References
North Carolina Election of 1898
North Carolina Manual of 1913
North Carolina Historical Marker

1855 births
1930 deaths
Members of the North Carolina House of Representatives
North Carolina state senators
Secretaries of State of North Carolina
People's Party (United States) elected officials
North Carolina Populists